Group B of UEFA Euro 2012 began on 9 June 2012 and ended on 17 June 2012. The pool was made up of the Netherlands, Denmark, Germany and Portugal. Germany and Portugal progressed to the quarter-finals, while Denmark and the Netherlands were eliminated from the tournament.

Group B was dubbed by many the "group of death" of Euro 2012. All four teams were in the top 10 of the FIFA World Rankings at the start of the tournament.

In the first round, Denmark upset Netherlands 1–0 with a 24th-minute goal from Michael Krohn-Dehli. In the next match, Germany defeated Portugal 1–0 with a 72nd-minute goal from Mario Gómez, leaving Germany and Denmark tied at three points at the top of the group with Portugal and the Netherlands at the bottom of the group with no points.

In the second round, when Portugal played Denmark, Portugal went ahead 2–0 with a 24th-minute goal from Pepe and a 36th-minute goal from Hélder Postiga, but with two goals from Nicklas Bendtner (41st and 80th minute), Denmark equalized. However, Portugal's Silvestre Varela scored in the 87th minute to give Portugal the win. In the next match, Netherlands and Germany continued their longstanding rivalry. Striker Mario Gómez scored twice in the first half (24th and 38th minute) to put the Germans ahead 2–0, and despite a 73rd-minute goal from Robin van Persie, Germany won 2–1.

Leading into the third round, all four teams were still able to qualify and no team was already qualified, despite the fact that Germany had 6 points and Netherlands had 0 points. Ultimately, Germany defeated Denmark 2–1 after Lukas Podolski and Lars Bender scored for Germany in the 19th and 80th minutes, respectively, despite an equalizer from Michael Krohn-Dehli in the 24th minute. In the other match (played simultaneously in order to prevent the teams from gaining a strategic advantage by knowing the result of the other match on the same day) between Portugal and Netherlands, Rafael van der Vaart scored to give the Netherlands a lead for the first time in the entire tournament, but after much criticism in the media for his failure to score in the first two matches, Cristiano Ronaldo scored twice to secure a 2–1 victory for Portugal. With these results, Germany and Portugal qualified, in first and second place, respectively, and Denmark and Netherlands were eliminated.

Teams

Notes

Standings

In the quarter-finals,
The winner of Group B, Germany, advanced to play the runner-up of Group A, Greece.
The runner-up of Group B, Portugal, advanced to play the winner of Group A, Czech Republic.

Matches

Netherlands vs Denmark

Germany vs Portugal

Denmark vs Portugal

Netherlands vs Germany

Portugal vs Netherlands

Denmark vs Germany

References

External links
UEFA Euro 2012 Group B

Group B
Group
Portugal at UEFA Euro 2012
Group
Group